Events from the year 1895 in Ireland.

Events 
22 March – the burned body of Bridget Cleary is discovered in County Tipperary; her husband, Michael, is subsequently convicted and imprisoned for manslaughter, his defence being a belief that he had killed a changeling left in his wife's place after she had been abducted by fairies.
3–5 April – Wilde v Queensberry: Oscar Wilde presses a criminal libel case in London against the Marquess of Queensberry, who is defended by Edward Carson. Wilde loses the case.
25 May – Regina v. Wilde: Oscar Wilde is convicted of gross indecency and sentenced to two years' hard labour.
7 August – United Kingdom general election
Edward Carson is re-elected in a Trinity College Dublin seat and as senior MP becomes a member of the Privy Council of Ireland.
Michael Davitt enters the British House of Commons as the elected Member of Parliament for South Mayo. He has been refused entry on two previous attempts.
23 December – Grand Opera House in Belfast is opened.
24 December – Kingstown Lifeboat Disaster: the Kingstown Life-boat capsizes on service: all fifteen crew are lost.
Belfast Botanic Gardens becomes a public park when Belfast Corporation purchases the gardens from the Belfast Botanical and Horticultural Society.

Arts and literature 
3 January – première of Oscar Wilde's comedy An Ideal Husband in London.
14 February – première of Oscar Wilde's last play, the comedy The Importance of Being Earnest, in London.
4 April – First Kinetoscope exhibition in Ireland advertised, at the Dublin premises of the Kinetoscope Company.

Sport

Football
International
9 March  England 9–0 Ireland (in Derby)
16 March  Ireland 2–2 Wales (in Belfast)
30 March  Scotland 3–1 Ireland (in Glasgow)
Irish League
Winners: Linfield
Irish Cup
Winners: Linfield 10–1 Bohemians
1 May – Dundela F.C. is founded in Belfast.
c. September – Shelbourne F.C. is founded in the south Dublin suburb of Ringsend by a group of seven individuals, including James Rowan (St Margaret Place) and two Wall brothers Felix and Michael (Bath Avenue Place).

Births
8 January – John Moyney, soldier, recipient of the Victoria Cross for gallantry in 1917 north of Broembeek, Belgium (died 1980).
March – Joe Murphy, member of Irish Republican Army, (died 1920 on 76-day hunger strike during the Irish War of Independence).
25 May – Liam Mellowes, Sinn Féin politician, member of 1st Dáil (executed 1922 in Mountjoy Jail).
2 June – Seán McLoughlin, nationalist and communist activist (died 1960).
16 June – Warren Lewis, soldier and historian, brother of C. S. Lewis (died 1973).
28 July – John Charles McQuaid, Catholic Archbishop of Dublin and Primate of Ireland (died 1973).
3 August – James Samuel Emerson, soldier, posthumous recipient of the Victoria Cross for gallantry (killed 1917 on the Hindenburg Line north of La Vacquerie, France).
3 October – Phelim Calleary, Fianna Fáil TD (died 1974).
24 October – Lady Constance Mary Annesley, afterwards Constance Malleson, writer and actress (as Colette O'Niel) (died 1975).
10 December – Moyna Macgill, stage and film actress, mother of Angela Lansbury (died 1975).
Full date unknown
 Max Dunn, poet (died 1963 in Australia).
 Florence O'Donoghue, historian and Irish Republican Army intelligence officer (died 1967).

Deaths 
 5 February – Robert Montresor Rogers, recipient of the Victoria Cross for gallantry in 1860 at the Taku Forts, China (born 1834).
 11 May – Patrick Carlin, Victoria Cross recipient for gallantry in 1858 in India (born 1832).
 14 August – Thomas Hovenden, artist and teacher (born 1840).
 12 October – Cecil Frances Humphreys Alexander, hymn-writer and poet (born 1818).
 26 November – George Edward Dobson, zoologist, photographer and army surgeon (born 1848).

References 

 
1890s in Ireland
Ireland
 Ireland
Years of the 19th century in Ireland